Hygrophila auriculata (Sanskrit: , Bangla (বাংলা নাম):  (কুলেখাড়া) kokilākṣa) is a herbaceous, medicinal plant in the acanthus family that grows in marshy places and is native to tropical Asia and Africa. In India it is commonly known as kokilaksha or gokulakanta, in Sri Lanka as neeramulli. In Kerala it is called vayalchulli (വയൽച്ചുളളി). In Tamil it is called  (நீர்முள்ளி).

Introduction - hygrophila or marsh barbel (English) It is commonly called in Tamil as a niramuli. An annual herbal plant growing up to 60 cm in height. The stem of the plant is tetragonal, hairy and stiff at the nodes. The bark is dark brown, although the leaves are elliptic-lanceolate and herpid. The flowers are purple and to a lesser extent violet blue. The fruit resembles a four-sided shape, linear, glabrous and about 1 cm long with seeds that are hairy and brown in color.

Medicinal usage in Ayurveda
In ayurveda, its seeds, roots and panchang (pancha = five and ang = parts, i.e. root, flowers, stem, fruits and leaves as ash burnt together) are used as a medication.

References

J.S. Gamble, 1921. Flora of the Presidency of Madras Vol.2

External links

auriculata
Taxa named by Heinrich Christian Friedrich Schumacher
Plants described in 1963
Flora of Africa